The Big Egg Wrestling Universe was a professional wrestling event held by All Japan Women's Pro-Wrestling (AJW) inside the Tokyo Dome in Tokyo, Japan on November 20, 1994 and was attended by 32,500 fans. However, some sources claim the event was attended by over 42,000 fans. The event generated approximately $4 million in revenue from ticket sales, as well as $1.6 million in merchandise sales.

The event featured representatives from joshi promotions GAEA Japan (GAEA), JWP Joshi Puroresu (JWP), and Ladies Legend Pro-Wrestling (LLPW), as well as puroresu promotions Frontier Martial-Arts Wrestling (FMW), Michinoku Pro Wrestling (MPW) and American wrestling promotion the World Wrestling Federation (WWF). In addition to female wrestlers, the event also featured matches with male wrestlers, midget wrestlers, female amateur wrestlers, female kickboxers, and female shootboxers.

Event

Production
The event, which lasted ten hours, was promoted as the biggest card in the history of women's wrestling. It featured 23 matches of various styles. The opening ceremony of the event featured a 60-piece band that accompanied a parade of wrestlers that each carried a flag representing a different wrestling promotion. The main event matches featured elaborate entrances from the female performers. Approximately $1.1 million was spent on the special effects used throughout the event.

Results

References

All Japan Women's Pro-Wrestling
Women's professional wrestling shows
1994 in professional wrestling
Events in Tokyo
1994 in Japan
November 1994 events in Asia
Professional wrestling in Tokyo
Professional wrestling joint events